Elections to Liverpool City Council were held on 1 November 1907.

This was the first Liverpool City Council election in which women stood as candidates : Miss Harriet Mary Johnson stood as an independent in the Dingle ward and Miss Ellen Robinson stood as a Liberal in the West Derby ward.

Nine of the thirty-four seats were uncontested.

After the election, the composition of the council was:

Election result

The significant number of uncontested seats means that these statistics should be taken in context.

Ward results

* - Retiring Councillor seeking re-election

Comparisons are made with the 1905 election results, as the retiring councillors were elected in that year.

Abercromby

Aigburth

Anfield

Breckfield

Brunswick

Castle Street

Dingle

Edge Hill

Everton

Exchange

Fairfield

Garston

Granby

Great George

Kensington

Kirkdale

Low Hill

Netherfield

North Scotland

Old Swan

Prince's Park

Sandhills

St. Anne's

St. Domingo

St. Peter's

Sefton Park East

Sefton Park West

South Scotland

Vauxhall

Walton

Warbreck

Wavertree

Wavertree West

West Derby

Aldermanic Election, 9 November 1907

At the meeting of the Council on 9 November 1907, the terms of office of fifteen alderman expired.

The following seventeen were elected as Aldermen by the Council (Aldermen and Councillors) on 9 November 1907 for a term of six years.

* - re-elected aldermen.

Aldermanic Election, 2 September 1908

Caused by the resignation of alderman Sir Robert Alfred Hampson (Conservative, elected as an alderman 
on 9 November 1907) was reported to the Council on 1 July 1908.

In his place Councillor John Gregory Taggart (Irish Nationalist, Vauxhall, elected 1 November 1907)
 was elected as an alderman by the Council on 2 September 1908

Aldermanic Election, 21 October 1908

Following the death of Alderman Edward Paull (Liberal, elected as an alderman 
by the Council on 9 November 1904) on 25 September 1908, his place was taken by Councillor Richard Robert Meade-King (Liberal, Vauxhall, elected 1 November 1905)
 when he was elected as an alderman by the Council on 21 October 1908.

By-Elections

No.8 Netherfield, 26 November 1907

Caused by the election as an alderman of Councillor William Watson Rutherford MP 
(Conservative, Netherfield, elected 1 November 1905) on 9 November 1907

No.9 Everton, 26 November 1907

Caused by the election as an alderman of Councillor Edward Lewis Lloyd JP (Conservative, Everton, elected unopposed 1 November 1906) on 9 November 1907.

No.27 Warbreck, 26 November 1907

Caused by the election as an alderman of Councillor Richard Kelly JP (Conservative, Warbreck, elected 1 November 1907) on 9 November 1907.

No.19 St. Peter's, 19 December 1907

Caused by the resignation of Councillor Alexander Armour (Liberal, St. Peter's, elected 1 November 1905)
 on 6 November 1907, which was reported to the Council on 4 December 1907.

No.19 St. Peter's, 15 April 1908

Caused by the death of Councillor Henry Miles (Liberal, St. Peter's, elected 1 November 1907)
 on 21 March 1908.

No.10 Low Hill, 15 April 1907

Caused by the resignation of Councillor John McEvoy (Liberal, Low Hill, elected 1 November 1905)
 which was reported to the Council on 1 April 1907,

No.15 Vauxhall, 16 September 1908

Caused by Councillor John Gregory Taggart (Irish Nationalist, Vauxhall, elected 1 November 1907)
 being elected as an alderman by the Council on 2 September 1908
.

See also
 Liverpool City Council
 Liverpool Town Council elections 1835 - 1879
 Liverpool City Council elections 1880–present
 Mayors and Lord Mayors of Liverpool 1207 to present
 History of local government in England

References

1907
1907 English local elections
November 1907 events
1900s in Liverpool